Brook Byers (born August 2, 1945, Belleville, IL (Scott Air Force Base)) is a senior partner at Kleiner Perkins Caufield & Byers and the brother of Stanford University Professor Tom Byers and Atlanta, Georgia engineering entrepreneur Ken Byers.

Early life and education
Raised in Atlanta, Georgia, Byers earned a bachelor's degree in electrical engineering in 1968 from Georgia Tech and an MBA from Stanford University.

Career
Brook Byers has been a venture capital investor since 1972. He has been closely involved with more than fifty new technology based ventures, over half of which have already become public companies. He formed the first Life Sciences practice group in the venture capital profession in 1984 and led KPCB to become a top tier venture capital firm in the medical, healthcare, and biotechnology sectors. KPCB has invested in and helped build over 110 Life Sciences companies which have already developed hundreds of products to treat major underserved medical needs for millions of patients.

Activity in biotechnology
Byers was the founding president and then chairman, of four biotechnology companies which were incubated in KPCB's offices and went on to become public companies with an aggregate market value over $8 Billion. He is often featured on the Forbes Midas list and is currently on the board of directors of ten companies; CardioDX, Crescendo Bioscience, Inc., Genomic Health Incorporated, Five Prime Therapeutics, OptiMedica, HX Diagnostics, Pacific Biosciences, Inc., Tethys, Veracyte, Inc., and XDx, Inc.  Previously, he served on the board of directors of Idec Pharmaceuticals (chairman), Athena Neurosciences (chairman), Signal Pharmaceuticals, Arris Pharmaceuticals, Pharmacopeia, Ligand Pharmaceuticals (chairman), Hybritech (chairman), Genprobe, Nanogen, and others. These companies have pioneered the medical use of molecular biology, monoclonal antibodies, personalized medicine, molecular diagnostics and genomics.

Other positions
Byers is currently a board member of the University of California at San Francisco Medical Foundation, the New Schools Foundation, Stanford's Bio-X Advisory Council and the Stanford Eye Council. He was co-chair of the five-year, $1.4 billion, UCSF Capital Campaign. In 2007, he was awarded the “UCSF Medal” as their honorary degree equivalent. In 2008, he was elected a Fellow of the American Academy of Arts and Sciences. In 2009, he received the Lifetime Achievement Award from the National Venture Capital Association.

Byers was president and a director of the Western Association of Venture Capitalists and is a contributing author of the book Guide to Venture Capital. He is currently a board member of the University of California at San Francisco Medical Foundation, the California Healthcare Institute, the NewSchools Venture Fund, Stanford's Bio-X Advisory Council, the Stanford Eye Council and TechNet. He is co-chair of the UCSF Capital Campaign.

He was formerly a director of the Entrepreneurs Foundation, the California Healthcare Institute, the Asian Art Museum of San Francisco, the Stanford University Graduate School of Business Advisory Council, UCSF's That Man May See Vision Research Foundation (chairman), and the Georgia Tech Advisory Board, and was a founder of TechNet.

Byers is also a member of the Environmental Defense Fund.

References

External links
KPCB: Brook Byers
Bio at Stanford University's Technology Ventures Program

Businesspeople from the San Francisco Bay Area
American venture capitalists
Georgia Tech alumni
Stanford Graduate School of Business alumni
Stanford University trustees
University of California, San Francisco staff
Living people
Kleiner Perkins people
American financial company founders
1945 births